Andrew Robert Kiefer (May 25, 1832 – May 1, 1904) was a U.S. Representative from Minnesota; born at Marienborn, Duchy of Hesse-Darmstadt, Germany; he attended school in Mainz; immigrated to the United States in 1849 and settled in St. Paul, Minnesota, in 1855; inspector and collector of the wharf in 1857; engaged in mercantile pursuits; enrolling clerk of the Minnesota House of Representatives in 1859 and 1860; entered the Union Army as captain of the Second Regiment, Minnesota Volunteer Infantry, on July 8, 1861, and served until July 18, 1863, when he was compelled to resign on account of ill health; commissioned by Governor Swift colonel of the Thirty-first Regiment of State militia in 1863; member of the Minnesota House of Representatives in 1864; was engaged in the wholesale mercantile business 1865 – 1878 and in 1880 became interested in real estate; clerk of the district courts of Ramsey County 1878 – 1883; unsuccessful Republican candidate for mayor of St. Paul in 1890; elected as a Republican to the 53rd and 54th congresses, (March 4, 1893 – March 3, 1897); was not a candidate for reelection in 1896; mayor of St. Paul in 1898; at the time of his death was the Republican candidate for city controller; died in St. Paul, Ramsey County, Minnesota; interment in Oakland Cemetery.

References
Minnesota Legislators Past and Present

1832 births
1904 deaths
Mayors of Saint Paul, Minnesota
Republican Party members of the Minnesota House of Representatives
Republican Party members of the United States House of Representatives from Minnesota
19th-century American politicians
Hessian emigrants to the United States
People from Börde (district)
Union Army officers